Joža Šeligo (August 3, 1911 – June 10, 1941) was a Slovene poet.

Šeligo was born in Preserje, the son of Josip Šeligo and Terezija (née Ula) Šeligo. He studied Slavic languages in Ljubljana, and then law. Šeligo started writing poems in high school and published them in the handwritten student newspaper Škorec. As a university student, he was the technical editor of the journal 1551, and he was a founding member of the Slovenian Club. In 1936 he started publishing poetry in the journals Ljubljanski zvon and Sodobnost. He married Ana Žitka in 1939, and the couple had two daughters. Šeligo obtained a job as a forest worker near Stražišče, and during this time he published his debut poetry collection Cesta (The Road), which contained 28 previous published poems and nine new ones. Šeligo started working for the Railway Directorate in Ljubljana in 1941, and he and his family relocated to Preserje. There he fell into a fit of depression and committed suicide on June 10, 1941.

Šeligo's poetry has a melancholy and resigned character, and is characterized by themes of homelessness, alienation, difference, and loneliness.

References

1911 births
1941 suicides
Slovenian poets
Slovenian male poets
Suicides in Slovenia